Rhinelander–Oneida County Airport  is a public use airport located  southwest of the central business district of Rhinelander, a city in Oneida County, Wisconsin, United States. The airport is owned by the city and county. It is primarily used for general aviation and is also served by one commercial airline.

It is included in the Federal Aviation Administration (FAA) National Plan of Integrated Airport Systems for 2023–2027, in which it is categorized as a non-hub primary commercial service facility. It is the seventh busiest of the eight commercial airports in Wisconsin in terms of passengers served and the only one to not have Air Traffic Control services on field.

History
In 1975, North Central Airlines (which later merged with Southern and Hughes Air West to form Republic, which was acquired by Northwest Airlines, itself acquired by Delta Air Lines) was considering ending service to Rhinelander. Robert Heck, who worked as a stockbroker in the same office building in Wausau, Wisconsin as Arthur Mueller, head of North Central Airlines, learned of that news. Heck then worked on a campaign, enlisting local, national, and business officials to modernize the airport and retain North Central service. He made presentations locally and in Washington, D.C. which led to businesses opening near the airport and a 1979 airport terminal to replace one that was 3,482 square foot in size. Heck later became a member of the airport commission. He was awarded the 1976 Aviation Award at the 21st annual Wisconsin Aeronautics Conference.

Facilities and aircraft
Rhinelander–Oneida County Airport covers an area of 1,259 acres (509 ha) at an elevation of 1,624 feet (495 m) above mean sea level. It has two runways:
9/27 is 6,800 by 150 feet (2,073 x 46 m) concrete runway with approved ILS, GPS and VOR/DME approaches, and 15/33 is 5,201 by 100 feet (1,585 x 30 m) asphalt runway with approved GPS approaches. Runway 27 has a 100 foot asphalt stop-way on the western end. In addition, the Rhinelander
VORTAC (RHI) navigational facility is located at the field.

For the 12-month period ending December 31, 2020, the airport had 24,958 aircraft operations, an average of 68 per day: 88% general aviation, 6% scheduled commercial and 6% air taxi. In February 2023, there were 43 aircraft based at this airport: 37 single-engine, 3 multi-engine, 2 jet and 1 helicopter. Both
based and transient general aviation aircraft are supported by the fixed-base operator (FBO) Rhinelander Flying Service.

The Rhinelander–Oneida County Airport enhances regional air travel safety by maintaining
an Aircraft Rescue and Firefighting (ARFF) 'Index A' trained team and related equipment.

Airlines and destinations

Passenger

The airport is part of the federal government Essential Air Service program. In 2012, Delta Connection carrier SkyWest Airlines bid for and then won the EAS contract on January 3, 2013. The airline currently receives $2,560,031 in federal subsidies per year operating 50-seat Bombardier CRJ200 jet aircraft through to January 31, 2024. On occasion, Delta uses the larger CRJ900 jet on the Minneapolis route. This was especially evident during the COVID-19 pandemic, in which Delta only flew two flights instead of three with these larger aircraft.

Past air service includes Midwest Airlines, Frontier Airlines and Great Lakes Airlines. Northwest Airlines served the Minneapolis route and also had service to Detroit prior to the merger with Delta.

Top destinations

Cargo

Popular culture
John Heisman, college football's Heisman Trophy namesake, is buried in Rhinelander, which is his wife's hometown. A statue of Heisman is located just inside the Rhinelander-Oneida County airport.

See also
 List of airports in Wisconsin
 List of intercity bus stops in Wisconsin

References

External links
 Rhinelander/Oneida County Airport, official site
  from Wisconsin DOT Airport Directory
 
 

Airports in Wisconsin
Buildings and structures in Oneida County, Wisconsin
Rhinelander, Wisconsin
Essential Air Service